The Rassokha (also Россоха) is a river in the northeastern part of Yakutia, Russia. It is the major tributary of the Alazeya.

Geography

The Rassokha is formed by the confluence of the rivers Ilin-Yuryakh and Arga-Yuryakh in the Kolyma Lowland. The original sources of the uppermost river in the network are in the Ulakhan-Sis Range. The Rassokha flows across the Middle Kolyma District and the Lower Kolyma District in an area marked by permafrost, with numerous swamps and lakes. Finally it joins the left bank of the Alazeya  from its mouth.

The river freezes in late September through early October and stays icebound until the end of May.

Fauna
The forest tundra of the Rassokha basin, together with the Kondakov Plateau and the Suor Uyata and the Ulakhan-Tas, is part of the migration corridor of the Sundrun reindeer population.

See also
List of rivers of Russia

References

Rivers of the Sakha Republic
Tributaries of the Alazeya
East Siberian Lowland